Afrocorimus endroedyi is a species of beetles in the family Silvanidae, the only species in the genus Afrocorimus.

References

Silvanidae genera
Monotypic Cucujoidea genera